Bruce Murray Amos (born December 30, 1946, in Toronto, Ontario) is a Canadian International Master of chess, a high-calibre go player, and a mathematician.

Biography 
Amos completed his master's studies in mathematics at Yale University.

He was awarded the International Master title in 1969 for his high finish at the Canadian Chess Championship Zonal at Pointe Claire; Duncan Suttles and Zvonko Vranesic tied for the top spots. He played twice more in Canadian Zonals. At Toronto 1972, he scored 9/17, for a shared 9-11th place, and at Calgary 1975, he scored 9/15 for a shared 5-7th place. Peter Biyiasas won both the 1972 and 1975 Canadian titles.
 
Amos represented Canada three times at chess Olympiads. Amos won the silver medal on board two at the 1971 Student Olympiad at Mayagüez, Puerto Rico, and Canada won the bronze team medals. In 49 international team games in those four events, he scored (+23 =20 –6), for 67.3 per cent.
 Siegen 1970 Olympiad, 1st reserve, 9/13 (+7 =4 –2);
 Mayagüez 1971 Student Olympiad, board 2, 8/11 (+6 =4 –1), team bronze, board silver;
 Skopje 1972 Olympiad, 1st reserve, 10.5/15 (+6 =9 –0);
 Haifa 1976 Olympiad, board 4, 5.5/10 (+4 =3 –3), Canada placed 8th, its highest-ever finish.

At Reykjavík 1970, Amos narrowly missed a Grandmaster result when he placed 3rd with 11/15, ahead of several Grandmasters, with Guðmundur Sigurjónsson winning. He played in the 1973 Canadian Open and U.S. Open. After the 1976 Olympiad, Amos largely gave up competitive chess in favour of go, the Oriental board game, and became a top-ranking amateur go player.

References

External links 

1946 births
Living people
Canadian chess players
Chess International Masters
University of Toronto alumni
Sportspeople from Toronto
Yale Graduate School of Arts and Sciences alumni